Teng Fu-ju (born 20 June 1987), known by her stage name A-FÜ, is a Taiwanese singer and songwriter. Prior to her solo debut in the music scene, A-FÜ was a member of Lazy Bomb, an indie band, and a demo singer. She is known for her cover version of "Nothin' on You" by B.o.B and Bruno Mars, which drew wide attention on YouTube in 2010. In May 2011, A-FÜ released her debut studio album, That's How It Is, for which she received a nomination for Best New Artist at the 23rd Golden Melody Awards.

Early life
Born in Hsinchu City on 20 June 1987, A-FÜ grew up in the countryside in Xiangshan District and in Changhua County. Both her parents run a rental car business together, and as they were often busy with work when she was young, A-FÜ and her elder sister, Hsing Ju, spent much of their childhood under the care of their aunt. Despite this, A-FÜ still maintains a close relationship with her mother and grew up influenced by her mother's love for music, in particular songs by Teresa Teng. At a young age, A-FÜ entered in singing and recitation competitions. Also, at her mother's request, she learned the standard Mandarin enunciation by watching the Taiwanese educational programme The Daily Characters (每日一字) hosted by news presenter Lee Yen-chiu, which perhaps, has shaped her distinctive vocals, in a way.

She attended Kuang-Fu High School, a comprehensive high school in Hsinchu, and graduated from Shih Hsin University with a degree in public relations and advertising in 2010.

Career

During her college years, A-FÜ was the lead singer of an indie band called Lazy Bomb. The band released a self-titled EP in November 2007 and disbanded shortly after. Around this time, A-FÜ met music producer AL (何官錠), who is also a member and keyboard player of the pop rock band Six Plus (六甲樂團). She started collaborating with AL as a demo singer. The first demo which she recorded, titled "Sheng Sheng Man" (聲聲慢), was chosen as the ending theme song for the first season of the Chinese TV series Justice Bao. The Zhong guo feng music style of the song, coupled with A-FÜ's crystal-clear voice and diction, generated considerable buzz among the Chinese netizens. Soon after, A-FÜ's singing caught the attention of veteran host Chang Hsiao-yen, who later signed A-FÜ to her record label Forward Music. While awaiting the release of her debut album, A-FÜ garnered media attention after uploading her first video on YouTube in September 2010, her cover version of B.o.B and Bruno Mars's "Nothin' on You", which had racked up more than a million views within a week. She followed with more covers of popular hits, which includes "Bizarre Love Triangle",  "Qing Hua Ci" (青花瓷) by Jay Chou, Bruno Mars's "Just the Way You Are" and so forth. In December 2010, A-FÜ was featured as a backup singer during Stella Chang's comeback concert in Taiwan.

A-FÜ's debut album, That's How It Is, was released on 27 May 2011 and features a studio version of "Sheng Sheng Man" and her cover of "Nothin' on You". The album sold more than 25,000 copies in Taiwan within a month of its release. To further promote the album, A-FÜ performed a sold-out show at the Riverside Live House in Taipei on 25 June 2011, with Van Fan appearing as guest performer. On 3 July 2011, A-FÜ made a guest appearance at Jam Hsiao's mini-concert at Tamsui Fisherman's Wharf, performing "Just the Way You Are" and "Wei Tian Ci" (未填詞). In 2012, A-FÜ was nominated for Best New Artist at the 23rd Golden Melody Awards but lost to Ilid Kaolo.

Her next release, an extended play titled Happiness Is Around Us, was released on 7 March 2012. The second single off of the album, "Where Is The Love?", a self-composed track, was featured as an insert song in the drama series Big Red Riding Hood.

On 7 June 2013, A-FÜ released her second studio album, Sky Island, which debuted at number one on the Five Music Mandarin Album sales chart. It includes the track "Rang Wo Ai Shang Wo" (讓我愛上我) from the soundtrack album for the film Step Back to Glory (志氣). In May of that year, A-FÜ performed "Tie a Yellow Ribbon Round the Old Oak Tree" at Teresa Teng's memorial concert at Taipei Arena.

Her third studio album, Own Categories, was released on 19 June 2015. It features a duet, "Stop at the Crossing Ahead" (前面路口停), with Xiao Yu.

Personal life 
In January 2016, it was revealed that A-FÜ and YouTuber How How (Chen Tzu-hao) were in a relationship. The couple registered their marriage on 14 February 2019, and held their wedding ceremony in June the same year. Their son was born in January 2021.

In early April 2021, A-FÜ was accused of causing the breakup of the marriage of a manicurist and her husband, and also resulting in the manicurist's miscarriage. A-FÜ and her husband How How broke their silence on the accusation a week later, denying it and also revealing that they have engaged a lawyer to handle the allegations.

Discography

Studio albums

Extended play

Singles

Awards and nominations

References

External links 

  

1987 births
Living people
21st-century Taiwanese singers
Taiwanese Mandopop singers
Shih Hsin University alumni
Taiwanese Mandopop singer-songwriters
People from Hsinchu
21st-century Taiwanese women singers